Henrik Haggenmacher (November 6, 1827 – June 5, 1917) was a Swiss-born Hungarian industrialist, business magnate, philanthropist and investor. According to Forbes he was the 6th richest person in Hungary on the turn of the 19th century with a net worth of 18-20 million Hungarian pengő.

Life

Brewery 

In 1867 Haggenmacher bought a brewery. Already in 1875 the brewery became the third largest producer in Hungary. After World War I, the Dreher brewery, First Hungarian Stock-limited brewery and Haggenmacher brewery had to merge and the production was centralized in Kobanya. Thereupon the Haggenmacher premises became a storage facility.

Death
Henrik Haggemacher died in 1917.

Personal life

He married in 1854 Maria Magdalena Liechti (1834-1889). They had together 12 children. They were both Calvinists.
 Heinrich/Henrik (1855-1917)
 Géza (1857-1891)
 Walter (1859-1921)
 Robert/Róbert (1863-1921)
 Otto/Ottó (1864-1865)
 Árpád (1865-1914)
 Maria Martha/Mára Márta (1867-?)
 Melanie Louise Johanna/Melánia Lujza Johanna (1869-?)
 Friederike Elisabetha Antonia/Friderika Erzsébet Antónia "Frida" (1871-?)
 Alexander/Sándor (1871-1879)
 Oscar/Oszkár (1874-1942)
 Bertha Louise/Berta Lujza "Lilly" (Lili, 1878-?)

Literature
 Károly Halmos : Haggenmacher Henrik és Károly - Malomipar és serfőzés
 Marcell Sebők : Sokszínű kapitalizmus
 Katalin Koncz : Két nagyvállalkozó család vállalkozói stratégiájának összehasonlítása. (A Haggenmacher és a Hatvany-Deutsch család) In: Bürgertum und bürgerliche Entwicklung in Mittel- und Osteuropa. Szerk. Bácskai Vera. Bp., 1986.
 Zsuzsa Pekár Megemlékezés Haggenmacher Károly születésének 150. évfordulóján. Gabonaipar, 1985/2.
 Zsuzsa Pekár– István Pénzes : 150 éve született Haggenmacher Károly. Gépipar, 1986/6–7.
 Gyula Réz : Haggenmacher Károly (1835–1921). In: Magyar Agrártörténeti életrajzok. 1. köt. Bp., 1987.
 Zsuzsa Pekár : A Magyarországra bevándorolt Haggenmacher család. Turul, 1993/3.
 Zsuzsa Pekár : A Haggenmacherek Magyarországon. Turul, 1994/1–2., 1994/3.

References

1827 births
1917 deaths
Swiss expatriates in Hungary
Hungarian Calvinist and Reformed Christians
People from Winterthur
Austro-Hungarian people
Hungarian nobility
19th-century Hungarian businesspeople
Hungarian investors
Hungarian chief executives
Businesspeople from Budapest